Letherette is the first studio album by English producers Letherette. It was released on 15 April 2013 by Ninja Tune.

Reception

The album received generally positive reviews. The 405 gave it a score of 8/10 and Drowned In Sound gave it a score of 7/10. Popmatters listed the album at number 9 in its 2013 'Best of Electronic Music' end of year poll.

Track listing

Personnel
 Richard Robert – Producer, Writer
 Andrew Harber – Producer, Writer
 Jed and Lucia – Vocals
 Natasha Kmeto – Vocals
 Bed Modley – Electric Guitar
 Naweed Ahmed – Mastering
 Stephen Wilkinson – Photography
 Letherette – Artwork

References

External links
 Ninja Tune album page

2013 debut albums
Ninja Tune albums